Andreas Bonovas (born 13 November 1963) is a Greek former footballer who played as a midfielder and made 20 appearances for the Greece national team.

Career
Bonovas made his debut for Greece on 26 March 1986 in a friendly match against East Germany, which finished as a 2–0 win. He went on to make 20 appearances, scoring 1 goal, before making his last appearance on 23 August 1989 in the 0–0 friendly draw against Norway.

Career statistics

International

International goals

References

External links
 
 
 

1963 births
Living people
Greek footballers
Greek football managers
Greece international footballers
Association football midfielders
PAS Giannina F.C. players
Olympiacos F.C. players
Iraklis Thessaloniki F.C. players
Panargiakos F.C. players
Super League Greece players
Football League (Greece) players
Gamma Ethniki players
PAS Giannina F.C. managers
People from Ioannina (regional unit)
Footballers from Epirus (region)